Isabell Ost (born 21 October 1988) is a German speed skater. She competed in the women's 1500 metres at the 2010 Winter Olympics.

References

External links
 

1988 births
Living people
German female speed skaters
Olympic speed skaters of Germany
Speed skaters at the 2010 Winter Olympics
Place of birth missing (living people)